Liam James Davies (born 28 June 2006) is a Welsh amateur snooker player. Competing at the 2022 World Snooker Championship, Davies was the youngest player to win a match at the event.

As a result of high placing on the 2020–21 Q Tour, he was allowed to play in qualification events for the professional 2021–22 snooker season. In August 2022, Davies won three back-to-back junior world events, defeating Bulcsú Révész in the Under-16 championship and Antoni Kowalski in the Under-18 and Under-21 categories. He became the first player to win all three titles in a single year. Davies, who is partially deaf, is coached by Lee Walker. His father Leyton owns the Scala snooker club in Merthyr Tydfil.

Performance and rankings timeline

Amateur finals: 15 (12 titles)

References

2006 births
Deaf sportspeople
Welsh snooker players
Living people